"Foolish" is a song by American singer-songwriter Ashanti. It served as her debut single, the first from her self-titled debut album (2002) and was released by Def Jam Recordings, AJM, and Irv Gotti's Murder Inc. Records. It was written by Ashanti, Etterlene Jordan, Mark DeBarge and Irv Gotti, while production was overseen by Gotti. The song heavily samples DeBarge's "Stay with Me". Due to the inclusion of the sample, Mark DeBarge and Etterlene Jordan are also credited as songwriters. A promotional version of the single called "Unfoolish" features a verse from The Notorious B.I.G. from his song "F--king You Tonight".

The song was released as the album's lead single on February 11, 2002. It spent ten weeks at number one on the US Billboard Hot 100 and on the Hot R&B/Hip-Hop Songs chart, becoming Ashanti's second number one and third top ten on both charts. Elsewhere, "Foolish" became a top ten hit in the United Kingdom, Australia, New Zealand and Canada. The song was nominated for Best Female R&B Vocal Performance at the 2003 Grammy Awards, and won the Soul Train Music Award for Best R&B/Soul Single – Female. In 2009, Billboard ranked it 19th on its Hot 100 Songs of the 2000s Decade.

Composition
The song is performed in the key of C major in common time with a tempo of 89 beats per minute.  It follows a chord progression of F–G, and Ashanti's vocals span from A3 to C6.

Commercial performance
"Foolish" spent 10 consecutive weeks at number one on the Billboard charts and a total of 17 weeks in the top 10. It would later get ranked the second best performing single of 2002, and listed as the 132nd best single.

Music video
The filming session of the video for the single took place during January 2002. It was directed by Irv Gotti. The video shows the viewer a relationship where a man, played by Terrence Howard, gets involved into some criminal acts after telling his girlfriend [Ashanti] that he is in construction and is unfaithful to Ashanti with Love & Hip Hop: Atlanta reality star Althea, which ends up in a break-up after some quarrel. As the song suggests, Ashanti feels that she still loves her ex and that she just can't seem to get over him and becomes frusturated since her heart and her mind force her to love him and hate him at the same time. In supporting roles we can also see Charli Baltimore, Vita, Ja Rule and Irv Gotti. The video is set in the fashion of the movie Goodfellas, with Ashanti in the role of Karen Hill and Terrence Howard in the role of Henry Hill. Irv Gotti and Ja Rule are also in a scene appearing to take the roles of Jimmy Conway and Paulie Cicero. The video was a three-time nominee at the 2002 MTV Video Music Awards for Best Female Video, Best R&B Video, and Best New Artist.

Track listings

European CD single
 "Foolish" (radio edit) – 3:52
 "Foolish" (instrumental) – 3:52

Australian and US maxi single
 "Foolish" (radio edit) – 3:52
 "Foolish" (album version) – 3:48
 "Foolish" (instrumental) – 3:51
 "Foolish" (video)

UK 5-inch CD single
 "Foolish" (album version) – 3:48
 "Unfoolish" (clean album version) – 3:15
 "Foolish" (Topnotch Remix)
 "Foolish" (video)

Credits and personnel
Credits are adapted from the liner notes of Ashanti.
 Instrumentation – 7 Aurelius
 Mixing – Supa Engineer Duro, Irv Gotti
 Production – 7 Aurelius, Irv Gotti
 Songwriting – 7 Aurelius, A. Douglas, E. Jordan, I. Lorenzo, M. DeBarge
 Recording – Milwaukee Buck
 Recording assistance – Terry "Murda Mac" Herbert

Charts

Weekly charts

Year-end charts

Decade-end charts

All-time charts

Certifications

Release history

See also
 List of Hot 100 number-one singles of 2002 (U.S.)
 List of number-one R&B singles of 2002 (U.S.)
 List of best-selling singles

References

2002 debut singles
Ashanti (singer) songs
Contemporary R&B ballads
Billboard Hot 100 number-one singles
2000s ballads
Songs written by Ashanti (singer)
Songs written by Irv Gotti
2002 songs
Songs written by Channel 7 (musician)
Def Jam Recordings singles
Songs about infidelity